Jack Carty is an Irish cricketer. He made his Twenty20 debut for Munster Reds in the 2018 Inter-Provincial Trophy on 18 May 2018. He made his List A debut on 22 May 2021, for Munster Reds in the 2021 Inter-Provincial Cup.

References

External links
 

Year of birth missing (living people)
Living people
Irish cricketers
Munster Reds cricketers
Leinster Lightning cricketers
Place of birth missing (living people)